Dr Lonnie D. Kliever (1932–2004) was chair of the Department of Religious Studies at the Southern Methodist University (SMU).

Early life 
Kliever was born in Corn, Oklahoma, a small town in the southwestern part of the state; but spent most of his boyhood in Fort Worth.  He suffered a severe childhood case of rickets brought on by a calcium deficiency.  This stunted his growth, he stood well under 5 feet tall.

Education 
Kliever was educated at Hardin–Simmons University, Union Theological Seminary in New York, and Duke University, where he received a Ph.D. in Religion and Philosophy in 1963.

Career 
After spending a total of thirteen years teaching at three different institutions (University of Texas at El Paso, Trinity University in San Antonio, and the University of Windsor), he joined SMU's Department of Religious Studies in 1975 as professor and chair.  He served two terms as chair, the first from 1975 through 1986 and the second from 1993 to 1999.  During his twenty-nine-year career at SMU, he published four books on various theological and ethical topics, and wrote numerous articles and op-ed pieces. He received three of SMU's highest honors: the M Award, the Rotunda Teacher of the Year Award, and the Godbey Lecture Series Author's Award.

He was  accomplished in traditional areas such as theology, ethics and philosophy of religion.  One of the two of his most widely known books published in 1981, The Shattered Spectrum: A Survey of Contemporary Theology is an analysis of the proliferation of new theologies in the 1960s and 70s.

His expertise was on the rise of new religious movements, cults and sects exploring  the dynamics of that Unification Church community and its underpinnings.  He closely followed the siege of the Branch Davidian church near Waco in 1993 and was critical of the intervention by the federal government in the standoff.  He was often sought for consultation by  police and governmental agencies as they confronted issues related to new and little known religious communities. In 1997, Dr. Kliever was consulted about the Chen Tao ("True Way") religious movement in Garland, Texas. His consultation was kept quiet by mutual agreement with the Garland Police Department until after the successful conclusion of the apocalyptic prediction whereby God was supposed to come and pick them up in a "flying saucer". It was in large part due to Dr. Kliever's advice that there was no over-escalation or over-reaction on the part of law enforcement in the last hours where other groups had taken poison to kill themselves. His counsel was instrumental during the months before the events; He was given unprecedented access to the inner workings of the group which provided clues to indicate that they were not dangerous to themselves or the community. This become the model for law enforcement's role when interacting with new religious movements and determining what traits indication propensity for violence and which ones did not.

Outside of academia, Kliever was best known for his role in exposing a massive scandal involving SMU's football program in 1986 and 1987.  As SMU's faculty athletics representative from 1984 to 1987, Kliever started an investigation into the program after a former player alleged that players were being paid.  He worked very closely with the NCAA, with whom he had already gained a reputation for integrity.  He insisted that SMU cooperate fully with the NCAA investigators, resulting in the NCAA enforcement staff supporting his proposal to limit SMU to nine games in 1987 and 1988.  While the infractions committee ultimately imposed the "death penalty" on SMU by shutting down the program for the 1987 season, it praised Kliever for his work.

Bibliography

Books 
 Radical Christianity: The new theologies in perspective (1968) 282 pp. Droke House, ASIN B0006BUD1E
 Shattered Spectrum: A Survey of Contemporary Theology. (1981) John Knox Pr. 
 The Terrible Meek: Religion and Revolution in Cross Cultural Perspective (1987). Washington Inst Pr. 
 Dax's Case: Essays in Medical Ethics and Human Meaning (1989) Ed. Southern Methodist Univ Pr; 1st ed. edition. 
 H. Richard Niebuhr (Makers of the Modern Theological Mind) (1991) 205pp. Hendrickson Publishers. 
 The reliability of apostate testimony about new religious movements. Freedom Publishing (1995) ASIN B0006QUW6A

Journal articles

References 

Researchers of new religious movements and cults
Hardin–Simmons University alumni
Union Theological Seminary (New York City) alumni
American theologians
Duke University alumni
Southern Methodist University faculty
1932 births
2004 deaths
University of Texas at El Paso faculty
People from Washita County, Oklahoma
People from Fort Worth, Texas